The Elkhorn Stakes is a Grade II American Thoroughbred horse race for four-year-olds and older over a distance of  miles on the turf held annually in early April at Keeneland Race Course, Lexington, Kentucky during the spring meeting. It currently offers a purse of $200,000.

History

The event is named for Elkhorn and area which it is believed that Daniel Boone took his first steps in what is now Kentucky near present-day Elkhorn City on a hunting expedition. Also the name is synonymous with Elkhorn Creek, a stream running through several counties in Central Kentucky.

The event was inaugurated on 20 April 1986 and was won by Lieutenant's Lark, starting 10-1 went wire-to-wire with Frank Lovato Jr. aboard in a time of 1:54 over the  miles distance. The event was increased to the current distance of a mile and one half in 1996.

A Grade III event from 1988 to 1989 and from 1996 to 2007, it was a Grade II event from 1990 to 1995 and in 2008 was returned to its Grade II status.

Several champions have won this event including the 1986 US Champion Male Turf Horse Manila in his season debut of 1987 and the dual Breeders' Cup Mile winner Lure who won this event in 1994 easily by four lengths as a short priced favorite. Both these champions won the event when it was  miles. Chief Bearhart won this event at the  miles distance in 1997 en route to becoming Canadian Horse of the Year and also US Champion Male Turf Horse.

Records
Speed  record
 miles: 2:27.10 – Channel Maker (2022) 
 miles: 1:47.00 – Marvin's Faith (IRE) (1995)

Margins
 lengths –  Epicentre (2004)

Most wins
 2 – African Dancer (1998, 1999)
 2 – Kim Loves Bucky (2002, 2003)
 2 – Musketier (GER) (2010, 2011)

Most wins by an owner
 2 – Pin Oak Stable (1998, 1999)
 2 – Kim Glenney (2002, 2003)
 2 – Phipps Stable (2008, 2012)
 2 – Sam-Son Farm (1997, 2021)

Most wins by a jockey
 5 – Jerry Bailey (1992, 1998, 1999, 2000, 2004)

Most wins by a trainer
 4 – Roger Attfield (2006, 2009, 2010, 2011)
 4 – Michael J. Maker (2013, 2016, 2019, 2020)

Winners

See also 
 List of American and Canadian Graded races

External links 
 2015 Keeneland Media Guide

References

Graded stakes races in the United States
Grade 2 stakes races in the United States
Turf races in the United States
Flat horse races for four-year-olds
Keeneland horse races
Recurring sporting events established in 1986
1986 establishments in Kentucky